Gil Fuller & the Monterey Jazz Festival Orchestra featuring Dizzy Gillespie is an album by composer, arranger and conductor Gil Fuller featuring trumpeter Dizzy Gillespie recorded in 1965 and originally released on the Pacific Jazz label. The album was rereleased on CD combined with Fuller's Night Flight (Pacific Jazz, 1965) on the Blue Note label as Gil Fuller & the Monterey Jazz Festival Orchestra featuring Dizzy Gillespie & James Moody in 2008.

Reception
The Allmusic review called the album "A bit of a disappointment... the big band is mostly heard from in a purely accompanying role behind the great trumpeter and little interplay occurs".

Track listing
All compositions by Gil Fuller except as indicated
 "Man from Monterey" (Phil Moore) - 4:00 
 "Angel City" - 8:20 
 "Love Theme from the Sandpiper" (Johnny Mandel, Paul Francis Webster) - 2:48 
 "Groovin' High" (Dizzy Gillespie) - 3:27 
 "Be's That Way" - 4:39 
 "Big Sur" - 4:37 
 "Moontide" - 3:56 
 "Things Are Here" (Gillespie) - 4:19

Personnel
Gil Fuller - arranger, conductor
Dizzy Gillespie, John Audino, Harry 'Sweets' Edison, Freddie Hill, Melvin Moore  - trumpet
Gabe Baltazar, Buddy Collette - alto saxophone
Bill Green, Carrington Visor - tenor saxophone
Jack Nimitz - baritone saxophone 
Sam Cassano, David Duke, Herman Lebow, Alan Robinson - French horn
Jim Amlotte, Bob Fitzpatrick, Lester Robinson - trombone
Dennis Budimir - guitar
Phil Moore - piano 
Jimmy Bond - bass 
Earl Palmer - drums

References 

Pacific Jazz Records albums
Gil Fuller albums
Dizzy Gillespie albums
1965 albums
Albums arranged by Gil Fuller
Albums conducted by Gil Fuller